Didymosellidae is a family of bryozoans belonging to the order Cheilostomatida.

Genera:
 Bimicroporella Canu, 1904
 Didymosella Canu & Bassler, 1917
 Tubiporella Levinsen, 1909

References

Cheilostomatida